World War III, World War Three, or Third World War is a hypothetical successor to World War II.

World War III or World War 3 may also refer to:

Literature 
World War III (Left Behind), a rider in the Left Behind series of novels
The Third World War (novel), a 2003 novel by Humphrey Hawksley
The Third World War: August 1985, and its sequel The Third World War: The Untold Story, novels by Sir John Hackett

Comics 
World War 3 Illustrated, a political comics anthology founded in 1979
Third World War (comics), a political comic strip appearing in Crisis beginning in 1988
World War III (DC Comics), the title of two sagas published in superhero comic books by DC Comics beginning in 2000
World War III (G.I. Joe), a comic book storyline published by Devil's Due Publishing beginning in 2007

Games 
The Third World War (video game), for the Sega Mega-CD console
World War III: Black Gold, a 2001 Microsoft Windows computer game
World War 3 (video game), a 2018 game by The Farm 51

Film and television 
World War III (1998 film), a 1998 German film by Robert Stone
World War III (2022 film), a 2022 Iranian film
WW3, a 2001 TV-movie starring Timothy Hutton and Vanessa L. Williams
World War III, a 1989 movie narrated by Joe Huser
World War III (miniseries), a 1982 American TV miniseries directed by David Greene
"World War Three" (Doctor Who), an episode in the 2005 series of the BBC science fiction television series Doctor Who
WCW World War 3, an annual professional wrestling pay-per-view event
World War 3 (1995)
World War 3 (1996)
World War 3 (1997)
World War 3 (1998)
 "World War III", a 1985 episode of the TV sitcom Night Court

Music

Bands 
Third World War (band), an English proto-punk band formed in 1970
WWIII, a Los Angeles-based band fronted by Mandy Lion

Albums
World War III (Mac album), 1999
World War III (Madina Lake album), 2011
WWIII (album), a 2003 album by KMFDM

Songs
"World War III", a song by Anti-Nowhere League from We Are...The League, 1982
"World War III", a song by Bad Religion from Bad Religion, 1981
"World War III", a 1982 song by Exciter
"World War III", a song by Grandmaster Flash and the Furious Five from Grandmaster Flash and the Furious Five, 1984
"World War III", a song by  the Jonas Brothers from Lines, Vines and Trying Times, 2009
"World War III", a 1979 song by The Suburbs
"World War Three", a 1979 song by D.O.A.
"WW III", a 2000 song by Ruff Ryders from Ryde or Die Vol. 2
"WWIII", a 2020 song by Machine Gun Kelly from Tickets to My Downfall
"WW3", a 2017 song by Paloma Faith from The Architect
"3rd World War", a 2013 song by Jesse Jagz from the soundtrack of the film Heaven's Hell